Vikruthi is a 2019 Indian Malayalam-language comedy drama film directed by Emcy Joseph and produced by A. D. Sreekumar, Ganesh Menon and Lakshmi Warrier. The film stars Suraj Venjarammoodu and Soubin Shahir in the lead roles. The film is based on true events that occurred on a Kochi Metro train, where a picture of a sleeping hearing/speech-impaired man was taken and shared online by a passenger assuming he was drunk. It upsets the man and his family after it goes viral. The film was released on 4 October 2019. The film was remade in Tamil as Payanigal Gavanikkavum.

Plot
Eldho and his wife Elsy are both hearing and speech impaired. After spending two nights in the hospital where his daughter was admitted, Eldho travels back home on a Kochi Metro train but he falls asleep. Another passenger, Sameer, finds this amusing and decides to post a picture of Eldho online, labelling him a drunkard. The rest of the movie explores the troubles Eldho and his family face when he is recognized by people as the "Kochi Metro Drunkard", as well as how Sameer deals with the consequences of his actions.

Cast

 Suraj Venjarammoodu as Eldho
 Soubin Shahir as Sameer
 Surabhi Lakshmi as Elsy
 Vincy Aloshious as Zeenath
 Mamukkoya as Muhammad / Sameer's Father
 Gracy Soudi as Khadeejumma
 Pauly Valsan as Reethamma
 Jaffar Idukki as Varghese
 Irshad as Nazar
 Riya Saira as Sajitha
 Baburaj as C.I Siju Varkey
 Sudhi Koppa as Bineesh
 Bhagath Manuel as Elleyas 
 Sudheer Karamana as Prabhalan
 Nebish Benson as Basil
 Mareena Michael Kurisingal as Bella Varghese
 Meghanathan as Hassanikka
 Balu Varghese as Salim
 Shivaji Guruvayoor as Advocate Freddy
 Mamitha Baiju as Suhara

Production
The film marks the debut of Emcy Joseph as a film director. He is the founder of PERAKA MEDIA, the AD Film Production House in Kochi.

Soundtrack 

The soundtrack was composed by Bijibal with lyrics by Santhosh Varma.

Release
The film was released theatrically on 4 October 2019.

Box office
The film grossed approximately ₹3.85 crore in its first week run in Kerala.

Accolades
Kerala State Film Award for Best Actor - Suraj Venjaramood

References

Drama films based on actual events
2019 films
2010s Malayalam-language films
Indian films based on actual events
2019 comedy-drama films
Indian comedy-drama films
Films scored by Bijibal
2019 directorial debut films
2019 comedy films
Malayalam films remade in other languages